Dexter Daniels (1938 – c.1990) was a pioneering activist in the struggle for Aboriginal rights and land rights in Australia during the 1960s and 1970s. Daniels came to public attention as the breakaway Aboriginal Organiser of the North Australian Workers' Union (NAWU) in 1966 and was integral in supporting the Wave Hill walk-off.

Early life
Daniels was born at the Roper River Church Missionary Society mission in the Northern Territory of Australia. Established in 1908, it brought together the remaining fragments of groups previously occupying a wide area of the Roper basin and South East Arnhem Land. Daniels was one of many Indigenous activists from the Roper Mission who went on to become deeply involved in social and political struggles in the Northern Territory. They included the Roberts brothers, Clancy, Jacob and Phillip and Dexter Daniels and his brother Davis. "That's not right" was a response of which Daniels was "very fond" when discussing injustices.

The Wave Hill walk-off
Wave Hill Station is a pastoral station which was run by British pastoral company Vesteys. It employed many local Aboriginal people, mostly Gurindji. Conditions on the station for Aboriginal people were very poor. Their wages were not equal to those paid to non-Aboriginal employees and were often controlled. While an effort to introduce equal wages for Aboriginal workers was made in 1965, the Conciliation and Arbitration Commission decided to delay the payment of award wages for Aboriginal people in the cattle industry until 1968.

Spurred into action by this delay, Daniels sought backing from NAWU to support a strike by Aboriginal pastoral workers across the Northern Territory. His preliminary contact with workers in the Barkly Tablelands of the Territory resulted in Aboriginal workers leaving Newcastle Waters and Helen Springs cattle stations in April 1966. NAWU's Northern Territory Secretary Paddy Carroll refused to support a territory-wide strike on practical grounds, however. Daniels then sought and obtained backing from the Northern Territory Council of Aboriginal Rights, and travelled to Wave Hill Station with Communist and Waterside Worker Brian Manning and Tiwi actor Robert Tudawali. The support offered by Daniels and the NTCAR to Vincent Lingiari, leader of the Gurindji people, encouraged Lingiari to undertake the protest action that became known as the Wave Hill walk-off, on 23 August 1966.

The 1973 documentary film The Unlucky Australians by British director John Goldschmidt featured Daniels in a reconstruction of the Wave Hill walk-off. The film was narrated by Frank Hardy, who had championed the Gurindji cause.

General activism
After the Wave Hill Walk-off, Daniels travelled to Sydney on a speaking tour with Gurindji elder Lupngagiari (Captain Major). His advocacy and confidence quickly made Daniels a well-known and controversial figure among NT pastoralists and conservative politicians. In 1967, Daniels was arrested upon his return to his home community on a vagrancy charge. The charge was subsequently shown to have no basis and was dismissed.

During the later 1960s and early 1970s, Daniels again traveled interstate, leading numerous demonstrations and speaking at rallies for Aboriginal Land Rights in Sydney and Melbourne. Daniels lobbied for the land rights of his own and neighbouring clans also. Daniels lobbied for the land rights of his own and neighbouring clans also.

In April 1968, Daniels was arrested for vagrancy and sentenced to 14 days jail. He appealed the conviction and won. In July the same year, Dexter attended the World Youth Festival in Sofia, Bulgaria as a guest of the Communist Party of Australia.

After the award of a pastoral lease to the Gurindji people in 1973, he lived among them at Kalkaringi in 1975–76. Land rights over his own country was awarded automatically as an existing Aboriginal reserve by the Whitlam Government.

Later life
Daniels died in the 1990s in Katherine.

References

1938 births
1990s deaths
People from the Northern Territory
Australian indigenous rights activists